Suffolk County Cricket Club, in its current form, was formed in 1932.  The county first competed in the Minor Counties Championship between 1904 and 1914.  It then appeared again from 1934 and has been competing continuously since.  It has appeared in twenty-eight List A matches, making five Gillette Cup, fourteen NatWest Trophy and nine Cheltenham & Gloucester Trophy appearances.  The players in this list have all played at least one List A match.  Suffolk cricketers who have not represented the county in List A cricket are excluded from the list.

Players are listed in order of appearance, where players made their debut in the same match, they are ordered by batting order.  Players in bold have played first-class cricket.

Key

List of players

List A captains

References

External links 
 List A matches played by Suffolk at CricketArchive

Suffolk County Cricket Club
Suffolk
Cricketers